Happy Valley is an area in the city of Elizabethton and adjacent unincorporated Carter County, Tennessee, on the west side of Elizabethton. 

Happy Valley has a historical association with the Taylor family estate based at Sabine Hill. Happy Valley had a post office from 1850 until 1900. Nathaniel Green Taylor was the first postmaster.

The Carter County Board of Education operates three schools in Happy Valley: Happy Valley Elementary School, Happy Valley Middle School, and Happy Valley High School.

References

Geography of Carter County, Tennessee